For the hip hop artist, see Alrad Lewis.

Boola is a town and sub-prefecture in the forest region in the Beyla Prefecture in the Republic of Guinea.

Sub-prefectures of the Nzérékoré Region